The 2020–21 Indiana Hoosiers men's basketball team represented Indiana University in the 2020–21 NCAA Division I men's basketball season. The head coach was Archie Miller, in his fourth and final year as Indiana head coach. The team played its home games at Simon Skjodt Assembly Hall in Bloomington, Indiana, as a member of the Big Ten Conference. The Hoosiers finished the season 12–15, 7–12 in Big Ten play to finish in a tie for the 10th place. As the No. 10 seed in the Big Ten tournament, they lost in the first round to Rutgers.

On March 15, 2021, the school fired Miller after four years and began its search for the next men's head basketball coach. Two weeks later, the school named former Indiana player and New York Knicks assistant Mike Woodson as the new head coach.

Previous season
The Hoosiers started off another strong campaign by going 11–1 before dropping back-to-back games in late December 2019 and early January 2020. During the bulk of the conference season, IU was able to win most of their home games (7–3), while stealing a few road games (2–8) to end their final season with an overall record of 20–12 and a conference record of 9–11. Indiana entered the Big Ten tournament as the 11-seed where they faced the 14-seeded Nebraska Cornhuskers. The first round matchup ended in an 89–64 IU victory, staging a second round matchup with 6-seed Penn State. However, on the morning of March 12, 2020, the Big Ten Conference announced that it would be cancelling the remaining tournament games due to the COVID-19 pandemic. Following suit, that afternoon, the NCAA announced that it was cancelling all winter and spring championships. This announcement officially, and abruptly, ended the Hoosiers' season, where they were expected to make the NCAA tournament for the first time in 4 years.

Offseason

Departures

Recruiting class
Miller continued to implement his "inside-out" approach to recruiting by adding two more highly ranked recruits from Indiana: Trey Galloway and Anthony Leal, who was named 2020 Indiana Mr. Basketball on April 10, 2020. With Leal earning this honor, he made three straight Indiana Mr. Basketball's to attend IU, the first time to happen in the storied history of the program. In addition to these recruits, Miller also nabbed the New Hampshire Gatorade Player of Year in 4-star recruit, Jordan Geronimo. On May 18, 2020, it was announced that Khristian Lander, who was originally a 2021–22 commit, was reclassifying to 2020. He stated that a big factor in his decision was the chance to play with Trayce Jackson-Davis and "dominate the Big Ten."

2021–22 team recruits

2022–23 team recruits

Roster

Schedule and results
Due to the COVID-19 pandemic, games were played without an audience, or with very limited attendance.
With the entire 2021 NCAA tournament being hosted in the state of Indiana, the Big Ten Conference also decided to host the 2021 Big Ten men's basketball tournament at Lucas Oil Stadium in Indianapolis instead of the original scheduled site, the United Center in Chicago, Illinois. The idea behind this change was that teams playing in both tournaments could stay in Indianapolis and avoid excess travel and possibly avoid further exposure/transmittance of COVID-19. Lucas Oil Stadium was chosen as the host site since the 2021 Big Ten women's basketball tournament is being hosted at Bankers Life Fieldhouse.

|-
!colspan=12 style=| Non-conference regular season

|-
!colspan=12 style=| Big Ten Regular Season

|-
!colspan=12 style=| Big Ten tournament

Player statistics

Rankings

*AP does not release post-NCAA Tournament rankings

See also
2020–21 Indiana Hoosiers women's basketball team

References

Indiana Hoosiers men's basketball seasons
Indiana
Indiana
Indiana